The 1969–70 Idaho Vandals men's basketball team represented the University of Idaho during the 1969–70 NCAA University Division basketball season. Charter members of the Big Sky Conference, the Vandals were led by fourth-year head coach Wayne Anderson and played their home games on campus at the Memorial Gymnasium in Moscow, Idaho. They were 10–15 overall and 6–9 in conference play, and ended on a five-game winning streak.

No Vandals were selected for the all-conference team; junior forwards Malcolm Taylor and John Nelson, team captain,  were on the second team. Taylor was voted  the team's outstanding player.

References

External links
Sports Reference – Idaho Vandals: 1969–70 basketball season
Idaho Argonaut – student newspaper – 1970 editions

Idaho Vandals men's basketball seasons
Idaho
Idaho
Idaho